A ribu is a mountain that reaches a topographic prominence of at least . "Ribu" is an Indonesian word meaning "thousand".

In Indonesia and Malaysia, three categories of ribus are known according to the absolute height of the peak. The "Sangat Tinggi" (Indonesian for "very high") category is for peaks higher than 3,000 meters, "Tinggi Sedang" (Indonesian for "medium height") for peaks between 2,000 and 3,000 meters, and "Kurang Tinggi" (Indonesian for "less high") for peaks with an elevation of between 1,000 and 2,000 meters. Currently, a total of 270 ribus are known across the Indonesian archipelago, including those in Malaysia and East Timor. Some are popular hikes, such as Mount Rinjani, Mount Semeru, and Mount Kerinci, while others are much more obscure, and some do not even have official names.

Some famous Indonesian mountains, such as Mount Bromo and Tangkuban Perahu, are not ribus because they are connected to higher peaks by high passes and therefore do not achieve enough topographic prominence. At the moment, the Gunung Bagging website counts 115 Indonesian .

The list of the Indonesian ribus was compiled by Andy Dean and Daniel Patrick Quinn. As of October 2018, nobody is known to have completed the list.

While the term "ribu" has been adopted to describe "mountains that exceed a prominence of 1,000 meters" also outside Indonesia, the "spesial"-category remains acknowledged only there.

In 2022 an international project is underway to identify all of the approximately 7,000 ribus across the world.

See also
 List of the Indonesian ribus and 
 List of peaks by prominence
 List of volcanoes in Indonesia
 Ultra prominent peak

References

External links
 List of the Indonesian ribus and spesials on the Gunung Bagging website
 Feature in the Jakarta Post (newspaper)
 Interview with list compiler Dan Quinn in the Jakarta Globe (newspaper)
 Article in the magazine of the ÖTK on the issue of ribu-bagging (German)

Topography
Mountains of Indonesia
Indonesian words and phrases